Don Tetto are a Colombian rock music band created in 2003. The band was formed by Diego Pulecio (lead vocals, rhythm guitar), Carlos Leongomez (lead guitar), James Valderrama (bass, vocals) and Jaime Medina (drums).

History

Formation 
Don Tetto was formed in March, 2003 in Bogotá to compete at a battle-of-the-bands event hosted by a local radio station. Don Tetto was selected from the twelve best auditions. They then performed live for over 1,000 spectators, and won the contest.

Early days 
In August 2003 Don Tetto released their first single, “Pienso”, which was well received by critics and listeners. The band began experimenting with popular sounds of the time, trying to find a musical identity. Focusing on alternative rock, Don Tetto composed new songs and recorded a live demo EP. In March 2004 the band released their second single, ”Yo estaré bien”. This release made Don Tetto one of the best-known bands in Bogotá, and the song reached #1 at several radio stations.
In 2005 the band released a third single, "Soledad".

Mainstream success and Lo que no sabías 

Don Tetto recorded their first album Lo que no sabías in February 2007 at Artico Studios, under the supervision of producer Jorge Holguín. The album was remixed and mastered in Miami by Boris Milan and Mike Couzzic.

During the recording process, the band signed with Cabeza De Ratón Music Entertainment, led by their manager Ricardo Rodríguez, who also created their official fan club “Tettomania” in Bogotá.

Lo que no sabías was released on August 10, 2007, breaking sales records and occupying the 4th place of the bestseller albums list in Tower Records.

Their singles “Ha vuelto a suceder” and "Fallido intento" were well received by radio stations in Colombia.

Don Tetto filmed music videos for “Ha Vuelto A Suceder”, "Adicto al dolor (lagrimas)", "Adiós", and "Fallido intento". They completed a four-month tour of the United States, Puerto Rico, and Mexico.

Lo que no sabías was remixed and re-issued in 2008 with bonus tracks.

Miénteme, Prométeme 
Not long after finishing touring for Lo que no sabias Don Tetto began recording their second full-length studio album: Miénteme, Prométeme, released in mid 2010. The first single was "No digas lo siento". The release was accompanied by a self-produced music video depicting the band in a party setup. The single climbed to the top of the charts of MTV Latin America.

In 2011, they released another single, "Mi error" with a music video filmed in Orlando, Florida. This new single occupied the top spots on Hispanic networks HTV and MTV. Later in the year, they released a video for the titular song to the album.

In September 2011 the band was nominated both for a Latin Grammy and for the EMA's (MTV Europe Music Awards) as a "World Wide Act Latin American Nominee". Miénteme, Prométeme was remixed and re-issued in the final months of the year.

In 2012, the band released a new single, "Sigamos Caminando", topping the charts in several radio stations. A week later, they released a music video for the song. The video received heavy airplay on HTV.

In May, 2012, Don Tetto released the fifth and final single for the album: "Voy a ser quien dañe tu nombre".

Members 

 Diego Pulecio: Lead Vocals, Rhythm Guitar
 Carlos Leongomez: Lead Guitar
 James Valderrama: Bass, Backing Vocals
 Jaime Medina: Drums

Discography 
Lo Que No Sabías (2007)
Lo Que No Sabias (Special Edition) (2008)
Miénteme, Prométeme (2010)
360° (En Vivo Bogotá) (2013)
Don Tetto (2014)

Singles
"Adicto al dolor (lágrimas)" ("Addicted to Pain (Tears)")
"Fallido intento" ("Failed Attempt")
"Ha vuelto a suceder" ("It Has Happened Again")
"Adiós" ("Goodbye")
"Auto Rojo" ("Red Car")
"No Digas Lo Siento" ("Don't Say You're Sorry")
"Mi Error" ("My Mistake")
"Miénteme, Prométeme" ("Lie To Me, Promise Me")
"Sigamos Caminando" ("Let's Keep Walking")
"Voy A Ser Quien Dañe Tu Nombre" ("I´ll Be the One Who Ruins Your Name")

Videography 

 Ha Vuelto A Suceder
 Adicto Al Dolor (Lágrimas)
 Adiós
 Fallido Intento
 No Digas Lo Siento
 Mi Error
 Mienteme Prometeme
 Sigamos Caminando
 Una Noche normal
 Me Odia, Me Ama
 Si La Ven

Awards and nominations

Latin Grammy Awards
A Latin Grammy Award is an accolade by the Latin Academy of Recording Arts & Sciences to recognize outstanding achievement in the music industry.

|-
| 2011 || Mienteme – Prometeme || Best Rock Album || 
|-
| 2014 || Don Tetto || Best Rock Album || 
|-

MTV Europe Music Award
MTV Europe Music Awards EMAs Also known as, is a prize awarded annually since 1994 by MTV to popular music videos in Europe.

|-
| 2011 || Mienteme – Prometeme || Best Latin American Act || 
|-
| rowspan="2"|2012 || rowspan="2"| Mienteme – Prometeme || Best Latin America Central Act || 
|-
| Best Latin American Act || 
|-
| rowspan="2"|2014 || rowspan="2"| Don Tetto || Best Latin America Central Act || 
|-
| Best Latin American Act ||

Los Premios MTV Latinoamérica
Los Premios MTV Latinoamérica or VMALA is the Latin American version of the MTV Video Music Award.

|-
| rowspan="2"|2008 || rowspan="2"| Lo Que No Sabías || Breakthrough Artist || 
|-
| Best Artist — Central || 
|-
| 2009 || Lo Que No Sabías || Best Artist — Central ||

References

External links
 Commentary at Terra.com.
 MySpace page
 Official webpage
 Twitter page
 Facebook

Colombian alternative rock groups
Musical groups established in 2003
Colombian rock music groups
Musical groups from Bogotá
MTV Europe Music Award winners